During the 2006–07 English football season, Barnsley F.C. competed in the Football League Championship.

Season summary
During the early stages of the season, Ritchie was approached by Sheffield Wednesday about their vacant manager's position, following the sacking of Paul Sturrock in October 2006. However, the request was turned down by the club. Ritchie was sacked by Barnsley on 21 November 2006, with the team in the relegation zone of the League Championship.

Simon Davey was then appointed caretaker manager following Ritchie's dismissal. After a successful start he was given the job on a permanent basis at the end of the year, and later led the club to a successful fight against relegation at the end of the season.

Final league table

Results
Barnsley's score comes first

Legend

Football League Championship

FA Cup

League Cup

Squad

Left club during season

References

2006-07
Barnsley